Romance in the Night is a soft rock album of mostly covers by José Feliciano. It was released after the return of his historic hit producer Rick Jarrard on the Motown label in 1983.  The track "Let’s Find Each Other Tonight” (a Feliciano original) was his first single to make the Country charts  and was performed live in the 1996 movie Fargo by the Coen brothers .

Track listing
Side One:
”Lonely Teardrops” (Berry Gordy, Tyran Carlo, Gwendolyn Gordy) 4:20
”If You Have a Heart” (José Feliciano) 3:25
”Taking it All in Stride” (Tom Snow) 4:13
”Let’s Find Each Other Tonight” (José Feliciano) 3:45
”One Night” (Dave Bartholomew, Pearl King) 2:51
Side Two: 
”So Into You” (Robert Nix, Dean Daughtry, Buddy Buie) 4:05
”Play Me” (Neil Diamond) 4:18
”I Feel Fine”  (John Lennon, Paul McCartney) 3:18
”¡Cuidado!” (instrumental) (José Feliciano, David Witham) 4:13
”Romance in the Night” (José Feliciano) 5:48

Production Credits
Produced by Rick Jarrard & José Feliciano
Arranged by José Feliciano & Rick Jarrard
Recording engineers: Dick Bogert & Ellis Sorkin
Mixing engineer: Dick Bogert
Mastering engineer: Bernie Grudman

Art Direction: Johnny Lee
Design: Terry Taylor
Photography: Ron Slenzak

References

José Feliciano albums
Motown albums
1983 albums
Albums produced by Rick Jarrard